The 1922 NCAA baseball season, play of college baseball in the United States organized by the National Collegiate Athletic Association (NCAA) began in the spring of 1922.  Play largely consisted of regional matchups, some organized by conferences, and ended in June.  No national championship event was held until 1947.  In the northeast, the season began on March 29.

Conference Changes
Idaho and Southern California joined the Pacific Coast Conference, creating an 8-team league.
The Southern Conference was established ahead of the 1922 season, with many schools departing the Southern Intercollegiate Athletic Association.

Conference winners
This is a partial list of conference champions from the 1922 season.

Award winners

All-Southern team

References